David Whish-Wilson (born 1966) is an Australian author.

He was born in Newcastle, New South Wales but raised in Singapore, Victoria and Western Australia. He left Australia in 1984 to live in Europe, Africa and Asia, where he worked as a barman, actor, streetseller, labourer, exterminator, factory worker, gardener, clerk, travel agent, teacher and drug trial guinea pig. During this time he began to publish short stories in Australia (anthologised in Pascoe Publishing's Best Fifty Stories Collection) and had a longer piece short-listed for the Vogel/Australian Literary Award.

He currently lives in Fremantle, Western Australia, where he teaches creative writing at Curtin University.

Awards and nominations
2010 Ned Kelly Awards: Shortlisted for Line of Sight
2014 Shortlisted WA Premier's Book Awards for Perth
2015 Winner Patricia Hackett Prize for Fiction for The Cook
2020 Ned Kelly Awards: Shortlisted for True West

Works

Novels
The Summons (2006, Random House) 
Line of Sight (2010, Penguin)
"In Savage Freedom" in Hard Labour (Crime Factory, 2012)
Zero at the Bone (2013, Penguin)
Perth (2013, New South Publishing)
Old Scores (2016, Fremantle Press)
The Coves (2018, Fremantle Press)
True West (2019, Fremantle Press)
Shore Leave (2020, Fremantle Press)

See also
 Peter Whish-Wilson

References

External links

Living people
Writers from New South Wales
Writers from Western Australia
1966 births
Australian crime writers